György Kürthy (24 February 1882 – 27 December 1972) was a Hungarian actor, scenographer, writer and director of the theatre.

Biography
He maturated in Budapest, then moved to Munich where he learnt architecture. His first theatrical performance was in 1905 at Thália Theatre. He was a member of the National Theatre between 1906 and 1935. He worked as a chief director in Kolozsvár (today Cluj-Napoca, Romania) in the theatre year 1908-1909. Between 1916 and 1923 he taught at Academy of Drama and Film in Budapest. During the next year he played at National Theatre of Pécs. Then he moved back to the capital, and was a professor at the Hungarian University of Arts and Design from 1927 to 1930. In the following year he was the director of National Theatre of Szeged. He came back to the stage in 1953 when he played two years at Kisfaludy Károly Theatre and one year at József Attila Theatre.

His work was part of the painting event in the art competition at the 1932 Summer Olympics.

Family
He was the son of Emil Kürthy (1848–1920), a journalist. He was the second husband of  Mariska Vízváry (1877–1954), actress, and the father of Péter Kürthy (1926–), actor.  He died in Budapest.

Selected filmography
 White Nights (1916)
 Tales of the Typewriter (1916)
 The Perfect Man (1939)
 The Minister's Friend (1939)
 Gül Baba (1940)
 One Night in Transylvania (1941)
 People of the Mountains (1942)
 Dr. Kovács István (1942)
 I Am Guilty (1942)
 Bajtársak (1942)
 Majális (1943)

Bibliography
 Kulik, Karol. Alexander Korda: The Man Who Could Work Miracles. Virgin Books, 1990.

References

External links

1882 births
1972 deaths
Hungarian male film actors
Hungarian male silent film actors
20th-century Hungarian male actors
Hungarian male stage actors
Male actors from Budapest
Olympic competitors in art competitions